The music for the 2020 action-adventure survival horror video game The Last of Us Part II, developed by Naughty Dog and published by Sony Interactive Entertainment, was composed by musician Gustavo Santaolalla, with additional music composed by Mac Quayle. The original score album was released digitally alongside the game in June 2020, featuring the work of Santaolalla and Quayle. An additional extended play, Covers and Rarities, was released in September 2021, featuring five cover songs from the game and its marketing performed by Troy Baker and Ashley Johnson, who portrayed Joel and Ellie, respectively. The game also received two single releases as vinyl records: one in June 2018 featuring music from the trailers, and one in the Ellie Edition of the game in June 2020.

Santaolalla had previously composed the music for The Last of Us (2013). He created music based on the story pitch by creative director Neil Druckmann, and his work often inspired Druckmann to write new scenes. Santaolalla continued to use his signature instrument, the ronroco, as he felt that it enhanced Ellie's qualities; the game's main theme also uses a banjo, which he felt reflected its American setting and origin. While Santaolalla was tasked with creating the emotional, character-based tracks, Quayle contributed to the game's combat music. He was hired in 2018 due to his work on the television series Mr. Robot, and aimed to create a suspenseful sound to keep the action moving and reflect the anxiety-inducing gameplay.

The development team received permission to create cover versions of several songs from artists such as Pearl Jam, Shawn James, and A-ha. The covers became a significant part of the characters and their development; Ellie's guitar allows her to access memories and emotions, and Pearl Jam's song "Future Days" acts as a theme between her and Joel throughout the game. Critical reception to the music was positive, as reviewers felt that it connected appropriately with the narrative and added tension to the gameplay. It was nominated for numerous awards.

Production and composition 
Gustavo Santaolalla returned to compose and perform the score for The Last of Us Part II, as he had done with the first game. He was tasked by the team at developer Naughty Dog with creating the emotional, character-based tracks. Santaolalla worked on the game for around two to three years. Instead of scoring directly to the game's material, he created music based on the story pitch by creative director and co-writer Neil Druckmann, and the two later collaborated to fit the music into the scenes, where it would occasionally require a minor rewrite. He delivered small parts of the music over time, often inspiring Druckmann to write new scenes based on the tracks. With elements of the game still in development, Santaolalla worked with the story, characters, and artwork to craft the score, though he felt that his work on the first game ensured that he was already familiar with "the visual language". He wanted to maintain and extend motifs from the first game while introducing new elements. Santaolalla continued to use the ronroco, his signature instrument used in the first game's main theme, as he felt it enhanced Ellie's qualities through feminine sounds. Part IIs main theme uses a banjo, which Santaolalla felt reflected the game's American setting and origin; he was initially hesitant in using it, but the developers encouraged him to do so. The music during Joel's death scene intended to build dread but feel inevitable, as opposed to the surprise and sadness invoked during Sarah's death in the first game. Druckmann wanted to achieve moments in which the music conveys narrative elements: after Abby collects the medicine to save Yara, the music symbolizes her redemption; when she protects Lev in the game's conclusion, the music represents their relationship.

Mac Quayle contributed to the game's combat music. He was hired on the project in early 2018; the developers were familiar with his previous work on the television series Mr. Robot. Largely unfamiliar with gaming, Quayle immediately bought a PlayStation 4 and a copy of The Last of Us to familiarise himself with the series before meeting to discuss the second game. He began writing ideas for the game in May 2018, and delivered his final music in January 2020; he found the deadlines much more relaxed compared to film and television projects. The team discussed potential collaborations between Santaolalla and Quayle, including sharing stems and sessions, though ultimately their collaborations were minimal; they performed a three-day recording session in the PlayStation offices in October 2018, where they experimented with different sounds and instruments to create "grooves and textures" that were later used in the game. Quayle attributed the similarities between their work to the developers "really knowing what they wanted". Quayle's music aimed to represent the "relentless tension" of the gameplay sequences, consistently moving the action forward and heightening the suspense and anxiety. The developers wanted to avoid music that sounded "too electronic or too organic and natural". Quayle was provided with videos of early gameplay captures for inspiration, instead of composing directly to scenes. He used Logic Pro for his work, which he used to heavily manipulate the several live acoustic instruments. His favorite instruments on the project were the bass guitar and cello; for the latter, he brought in a professional cellist.

Albums

Music from The Last of Us Part II 

Music from The Last of Us Part II is a single consisting of two songs from the game: "Little Sadie" performed by Crooked Still, and "The Last of Us (Cycles)" by Santaolalla. The vinyl record, mastered by James Plotkin, was released in June 2018 following the game's presentation at E3, which featured the song "Little Sadie". It was available to purchase in blue from Mondo, and in red at the PlayStation Gear Store at E3. "The Last of Us (Cycles)" was released digitally as an individual single on September 27, 2018.

Ellie Edition 

A single featuring two songs from the game was released as a seven-inch vinyl record with the Ellie Edition of The Last of Us Part II on June 19, 2020. The songs, composed and performed by Santaolalla, were later released in the Original Soundtrack under different titles. The Ellie Edition was exclusive for sale in the United States.

Original Soundtrack 

The Last of Us Part II (Original Soundtrack) comprises songs from the game, composed and produced by Santaolalla. The soundtrack spans 28 tracks, covering a duration of 77 minutes. Sony Interactive Entertainment first published the album digitally on June 19, 2020. It was produced by Santaolalla, Aníbal Kerpel, and Scott Hanau, and mastered at Bernie Grundman Mastering by Patricia Sullivan. A vinyl record version of the score by Mondo was announced on September 25, 2020, mastered by James Plotkin and produced by Shannon Smith, with the cover designed by Tula Lotay.

In the context of the game, the music received praise. IGNs Jonathon Dornbush lauded Santaolalla's "moving" score, and Andy McNamara of Game Informer found that the music added tension. Kevin Dunsmore of Hardcore Gamer wrote that the "haunting and subtle melodies blend into the world seamlessly". Eurogamers Oli Welsh praised the score for its combination of banjo and electronics. The soundtrack was nominated for Best Physical Soundtrack Release at the 18th Annual Game Audio Network Guild Awards in April 2021.

Covers and Rarities 

The Last of Us Part II: Covers and Rarities comprises five cover songs from the game and its marketing, produced by Santaolalla and Quayle. The covers are performed by actors Troy Baker and Ashley Johnson, who portrayed Joel and Ellie respectively, as well as guitarist Chris Rondinella. Sony published the album digitally on September 27, 2021, as part of The Last of Us Day. A vinyl record version was made available for preorder simultaneously, with art designed by Dani Pendergast and liner notes written by Druckmann. Johnson and Baker's cover of "Wayfaring Stranger" plays over the game's credits; completing the game on the "Grounded" difficulty setting will play Baker's cover of "Future Days", while completing on permadeath plays Johnson's cover of "Through the Valley".

The in-game covers became a significant part of the characters and their development, namely Ellie with her guitar. Druckmann found that Ellie's guitar-playing allowed her access to memories and emotions; when she loses her fingers in the game's conclusion, it serves to sever ties to her memories and relationships. The song "Future Days" by Pearl Jam acts as a theme between Ellie and Joel throughout the game. The song was previously featured as part of One Night Live in an unbroadcast epilogue wherein Joel plays the song to Ellie. According to Druckmann, Sony was doubtful that Naughty Dog would receive permission to use the song; the band's manager agreed after hearing the story pitch, receiving a PlayStation 4 and a copy of the original game, and an advanced screening of a trailer. Although the song's album Lightning Bolt was released two weeks after the onset of the in-game outbreak in September 2013, Druckmann recalled seeing a live performance of the song several months earlier in July, and felt that its inclusion was realistic.

An acoustic cover of "True Faith", a song originally by New Order, was used in an animated commercial for the game. The cover is specifically inspired by a version of the song by Lotte Kestner, though she was not credited at the time; when Kestner reached out to Naughty Dog, Druckmann issued an apology and ensured proper credit. Shawn James was contacted by Sony in mid-2014 for permission to create a cover of his song "Through the Valley" for an upcoming game; James was unaware of how it would be used until he watched the game's first trailer at the PlayStation Experience in December 2016. Druckmann had specifically enjoyed the song and felt that it aligned with the game's darkness and emotion. The song went viral after the trailer's release, charting atop the Spotify viral charts in the United Kingdom. For the game's launch, Tash Sultana covered James's song for PlayStation Australia. Naughty Dog was able to secure permission to use "Take On Me" by A-ha in one of the game's scenes due to co-writer Halley Gross's friendship with Lauren Savoy, the wife of A-ha guitarist Paul Waaktaar-Savoy. Druckmann found that the song's lyrics addressed the game's themes in a lighthearted manner. He felt that the scene featuring the song being optional made it feel more important to the player, though the team considered making it unmissable instead. After Johnson worked with vocal coach Melissa Reese, the team felt that her singing was too refined, and asked her to consciously sing worse. Johnson and Baker performed "Wayfaring Stranger" in-character in the opening of a PlayStation Experience panel for the game in December 2017.

Accolades 
Santaolalla and Quayle's work on the game was nominated for at British Academy Games Awards, Game Audio Network Guild Awards, The Game Awards, Hollywood Music in Media Awards, New York Game Awards, and Webby Awards; it won the award for People's Voice at the Webby Awards. Scott Hanau, Rob Goodson, and Scott Shoemaker were also nominated for Outstanding Music Supervision at the Hollywood Music in Media Awards.

References 

Last of Us 2, The
Last of Us 2, The
Albums produced by Gustavo Santaolalla
The Last of Us
Last of Us 2, The
Last of Us 2, The